Fluxinella is a genus of sea snails, marine gastropod mollusks in the tribe Fluxinellini ( of the subfamily Seguenziinae in the family Seguenziidae.

Species
Species within the genus Fluxinella include:
 Fluxinella asceta Marshall, B.A., 1991
 Fluxinella brychia Marshall, B.A., 1991
 Fluxinella discula (Dall, 1889)	  	  
 Fluxinella euphanes  Marshall, B.A., 1991
 Fluxinella gellida (Barnard, 1963)
 Fluxinella lenticulosa Marshall, B.A., 1983
 Fluxinella lepida Marshall, B.A., 1983 
 Fluxinella marginata (Schepman, 1909)
 † Fluxinella maxwelli B. A. Marshall, 1983 
 Fluxinella megalomphala Marshall, B.A., 1991 			
 Fluxinella membranacea  Marshall, B.A., 1991
 Fluxinella polita  Marshall, B.A., 1991	
 Fluxinella runcinata Marshall, B.A., 1991
 Fluxinella solarium (Barnard, 1963)
 Fluxinella stellaris Bozzetti, 2008
 Fluxinella stenomphala (Melvill, 1910)
 Fluxinella stirophora  Marshall, B.A., 1991
 Fluxinella tenera  Marshall, B.A., 1991
 Fluxinella trochiformis (Schepman, 1909)
 Fluxinella vitrea (Okutani, 1968)
 Fluxinella vitrina Poppe, Tagaro & Stahlschmidt, 2015
 Fluxinella xysila Marshall, B.A., 1991

References

 Marshall, B. A. (1983). Recent and Tertiary Seguenziidae (Mollusca: Gastropoda) from the New Zealand region. New Zealand Journal of Zoology 10: 235-262.

External links

 
Seguenziidae
Gastropod genera